Dear, Dear Son-in-Law is a Singaporean Chinese modern family drama which was telecast on Singapore's free-to-air channel, MediaCorp TV Channel 8. It made its debut on 16 October 2007 and ended its run on 12 November 2007. It was screened at 9.00pm every weekday night and repeated every Saturday and Sunday from 4.30pm to 6.30pm. The serial consists of 20 episodes.

Plot
Jiang Wencai seems to have it all, a stable career and a happy family, until his eldest daughter Jiang Yijuan unexpectedly announces her engagement to an assistant designer, Zhang Shunfa. Distrustful of Shunfa and yet unable to express his objections, Wencai offers to rent a room to him so that he can chaperone the couple as he plots to break them up.

But soon, Wencai realizes that his future son-in-law is not his only problem. His eldest son Junji is being led into risky investments by his capricious mother-in-law; his second daughter Yijun whom he was proud of returned from abroad without completing her degree; his neglected teenager son and daughter also get into trouble behind his back. In turn, it was Shunfa who helps him resolve his family problems.

Unable to take the many setbacks, Wencai collapses and falls sick. He then conceives a scheme with Shunfa to teach his children a lesson.

Cast

Main cast

 Zhu Houren as Jiang Wencai who is the head of the household.
 Pierre Png as Zhang Shunfa. He is Wencai's prospective son-in-law. Initially At first, Zhang was going to marry Yijuan, Wencai's eldest daughter. He subsequently break up with her and falls in love with Yijun, Wencai's second daughter.
 Jeanette Aw as Jiang Yijun Nicknamed as Chili Crab, Wencai's third daughter.

Reception 
Avis Wong of The New Paper rated the drama 3.5 stars out of 5 with the drama having a good pace and story, with veterans acting well.

Viewership
This drama series was the 5th highest rated drama in 2007.

References

External links
Theme song
Official Website (English Edition)
Official Website (Chinese Edition)

Singapore Chinese dramas
2007 Singaporean television series debuts
2007 Singaporean television series endings
Channel 8 (Singapore) original programming